Satwiksairaj Rankireddy (born 13 August 2000) is an Indian badminton player. He and his partner, Chirag Shetty, are the first men's doubles pair from India to be ranked inside the top 10 of the BWF World Ranking, with a career-high ranking of 5.

Early life and background 
Rankireddy hails from a town named Amalapuram in the state of Andhra Pradesh and started playing badminton after following in the footsteps of his father, who was a state-level player in the past, as well his elder brother. In 2014, he joined the Pullela Gopichand Academy in Hyderabad and decided to become a doubles specialist.

Career

2018
In 2018, Rankireddy and Chirag Shetty played a crucial role in earning India a historic gold medal in the Mixed Team event at the 2018 Commonwealth Games, where they also won the men's doubles silver. They won their first BWF World Tour title in Hyderabad Open after beating the Indonesian pair of Akbar Bintang Cahyono and Muhammad Reza Pahlevi Isfahani in the final.

2019
In 2019, Rankireddy and Chirag Shetty became the first Indian doubles pair to win a BWF Superseries or BWF World Tour (Super 500+) title, when they won the Thailand Open title, beating the Chinese pair of Li Junhui and Liu Yuchen in the final. They followed it up with a runner-up finish at the 2019 French Open, where they lost in the final to the Indonesian pair of Marcus Fernaldi Gideon and Kevin Sanjaya Sukamuljo.

2021
In 2021, Rankireddy and Chirag Shetty lost to the Indonesian duo of Mohammad Ahsan and Hendra Setiawan in the second round to crash out of the 2020 Yonex Thailand Open. In July, he and Shetty competed at the 2020 Summer Olympics, but were eliminated in the group stage, following a loss to Marcus Fernaldi Gideon and Kevin Sanjaya Sukamuljo.  However, they were the only pair in the entire tournament who defeated eventual gold medalists Lee Yang and Wang Chi-Lin, whom they had narrowly beaten in their first group stage encounter. In December, Rankireddy and Shetty qualified for the BWF World Tour Finals for the first time in their career, but withdrew from the tournament after a loss in their first group stage match to the Danish pair of Kim Astrup and Anders Skaarup Rasmussen.

2022
In 2022, Rankireddy and Chirag Shetty started the year by winning India Open. They were also part of India's Thomas Cup winning team. In the final, having lost the first game to the Indonesian duo of Kevin Sanjaya Sukamuljo and Mohammad Ahsan, they displayed immense perseverance and tenacity to win the second game and close out the third game at 21–19, giving India a 2–0 lead over Indonesia. This was pivotal in helping India bag its maiden Thomas Cup trophy. Rankireddy and Shetty then won the men's doubles gold at the Birmingham Commonwealth Games, beating the home pair of Ben Lane and Sean Vendy in the final. At the BWF World Championships, Rankireddy and Shetty won a bronze medal, India's first-ever men's doubles medal at the tournament. They beat defending champions Takuro Hoki and Yugo Kobayashi in the quarterfinals, but lost in the semi-finals to eventual champions Aaron Chia and Soh Wooi Yik. They then won their first ever BWF World Super 750 title in the French Open by beating Chinese Taipei pair Lu Ching-yao and Yang Po-han in the finals.

Honours
 Bestowed with Arjuna Award for badminton on August 2020

Achievements

BWF World Championships 
Men's doubles

Commonwealth Games 
Men's doubles

BWF World Tour (4 titles, 2 runners-up) 
The BWF World Tour, which was announced on 19 March 2017 and implemented in 2018, is a series of elite badminton tournaments sanctioned by the Badminton World Federation (BWF). The BWF World Tour is divided into levels of World Tour Finals, Super 1000, Super 750, Super 500, Super 300, and the BWF Tour Super 100.

Men's doubles

BWF International Challenge/Series (10 titles) 
Men's doubles

Mixed doubles

  BWF International Challenge tournament
  BWF International Series tournament
  BWF Future Series tournament

BWF Junior International (1 title, 1 runner-up) 
Boys' doubles

  BWF Junior International Grand Prix tournament
  BWF Junior International Challenge tournament
  BWF Junior International Series tournament
  BWF Junior Future Series tournament

Record against selected opponents 
Men's doubles results with Chirag Shetty against Year-end Finals finalists, World Championships semifinalists, and Olympic quarterfinalists. Accurate as of 13 November 2022.

Awards and recognition

National 
 Arjuna Award: 2020

References

External links 
 

2000 births
Living people
Racket sportspeople from Andhra Pradesh
Indian male badminton players
Badminton players at the 2020 Summer Olympics
Olympic badminton players of India
Badminton players at the 2018 Commonwealth Games
Badminton players at the 2022 Commonwealth Games
Commonwealth Games gold medallists for India
Commonwealth Games silver medallists for India
Commonwealth Games medallists in badminton
Badminton players at the 2018 Asian Games
Asian Games competitors for India
Recipients of the Arjuna Award
Medallists at the 2018 Commonwealth Games
Medallists at the 2022 Commonwealth Games